Pododesmus is a genus of bivalves belonging to the family Anomiidae.

The genus has almost cosmopolitan distribution.

Species:

Pododesmus dunhamorum 
Pododesmus foliatus 
Pododesmus incisurus 
Pododesmus macrochisma 
Pododesmus maxwelli 
Pododesmus patelliformis 
Pododesmus paucicostatus 
Pododesmus pernoides 
Pododesmus puntarenensis 
Pododesmus rudis 
Pododesmus sella 
Pododesmus squama

References

Anomiidae
Bivalve genera